John Hugh David Eland FRS (born 6 August 1941) is a British chemist, and Fellow of Worcester College, Oxford.

Eland was educated at St John's School, Leatherhead and University College, Oxford. He is the son of Rev. Thomas Eland and Verna Prosser Eland (née Reynolds).

He is the research group supervisor of the Eland group.

Works
Double ionisation of ICN and BrCN studied by a new photoelectron–photoion coincidence technique, Chemical Physics, Volume 327, Issue 1, 21 August 2006
Single and multiple photoionisation of H2S by 40–250 eV photons, Physical Chemistry Chemical Physics, Issue 41, 2011

References

External links
Research.chem.ox.ac.uk
Google Scholar

British chemists
Fellows of the Royal Society
Fellows of Worcester College, Oxford
Living people
People educated at St John's School, Leatherhead
Alumni of University College, Oxford
1941 births